The Irish Classics are five Group One horse races run at The Curragh racecourse during the flat racing season.  They mirror the British Classic Races, the original five "classics", with one minor exception. The Irish St. Leger is open to horses older than age three, unlike the British counterpart which is restricted to three-year-olds, and is open to geldings, which are barred from all other British and Irish classics.

Races

The five Irish Classics are:

See also
 British Classic Races
 French Classic Races
 Japanese Classic Races
 United States Triple Crown of Thoroughbred Racing

References

Irish Classic Races